Kahului is a census-designated place (CDP) in Maui County in the U.S. state of Hawaii. It hosts the county's main airport (Kahului Airport), a deep-draft harbor, light industrial areas, and commercial shopping centers. The population was 28,219 at the 2020 census. Kahului is part of the Kahului-Wailuku-Lahaina Metropolitan Statistical Area which comprises all of Maui County, including nearby Wailuku and the town and former whaling village of Lahaina.

The retail center for Maui County residents, Kahului has several malls and major stores (including department stores in the Queen Kaahumanu Center). Attractions in Kahului include the Alexander & Baldwin Sugar Museum, Kanaha Pond State Wildlife Sanctuary, Kanaha Beach County Park, and the Maui Arts and Cultural Center.

Kahului is served by Kahului Airport, located outside the CDP.

Geography
Kahului is on the north side of the island of Maui on the shore of Kahului Bay. It is bordered to the west by Wailuku, to the southwest by Waikapu, and to the east by Kahului Airport and Spreckelsville.

Climate 
Kahului has a hot  semi-arid climate zone (Köppen classification BSh) with a dry summer season, due to its location on the leeward side of Maui, relative to the trade winds.

The most recent month without measurable (≥) rain is October 2013 with trace amounts, and the last without any rain is June 1957. The town is also one of the windiest places in the U.S. averaging 13.7 mph per year.

Demographics

As of the 2000 Census, there were 20,146 people, 5,880 households, and 4,421 families in the CDP. The racial makeup of the CDP was 10.06% White, 0.24% Black or African American, 0.27% Native American, 53.62% Asian, 9.91% Pacific Islander, 1.47% from other races, and 24.42% from two or more races.  8.75% of the population were Hispanic or Latino of any race.

There were 5,880 households, 34.9% had children under the age of 18 living with them, 51.9% were married couples living together, 16.6% had a female householder with no husband present, and 24.8% were non-families. 20.3% of households were one person and 11.9% were one person aged 65 or older.  The average household size was 3.29 and the average family size was 3.76.

The age distribution was 25.8% under the age of 18, 9.2% from 18 to 24, 27.6% from 25 to 44, 20.7% from 45 to 64, and 16.7% 65 or older.  The median age was 36 years.  For every 100 females, there were 97.3 males.  For every 100 females age 18 and over, there were 95.8 males.

The median household income was $46,656 and the median family income  was $52,610. Males had a median income of $30,659 versus $26,282 for females. The per capita income for the CDP was $18,049.  11.8% of the population and 9.7% of families were below the poverty line.  Out of the total population, 14.8% of those under the age of 18 and 11.6% of those 65 and older were living below the poverty line.

Economy
Major employers in Kahului include Walmart, Maui Electric Company, Macy's, Hale Makua Health Services, Aloha Air Cargo, Zippy's, Roberts Hawaii, and University of Hawaii Maui College.

Education
Public schools in Kahului include Maui High School, Maui Waena Intermediate School, Kahului Elementary School, Lihikai Elementary School, and Pomaika'i Elementary School.

Points of interest

 Alexander and Baldwin Sugar Museum in nearby Puʻunene
 Kanaha Pond State Wildlife Sanctuary
 Maui Nui Botanical Gardens
 Tasaka Guri-Guri — known for its "guri-guri" frozen dessert.
King's Cathedral Maui, the central hub for King's Cathedral and Chapels, an international megachurch.

References

Census-designated places in Maui County, Hawaii
Populated places on Maui
Populated coastal places in Hawaii